Mulona lapidaria is a moth of the subfamily Arctiinae. It was described by Francis Walker in 1866. It is found on Haiti.

References

 

Lithosiini
Moths described in 1866